Block 11 was the name of a brick building in Auschwitz I, the Stammlager or main camp of the Auschwitz concentration camp network. This block was used for executions and torture. Between Block 10 and Block 11 stood the "Death Wall" (reconstructed after the war) where thousands of prisoners were lined up for execution by firing squad.

The block contained special torture chambers in which various punishments were applied to prisoners. Some could include being locked in a dark chamber for several days or being forced to stand in one of four standing cells called "Stehzelle" in German. Punishment in these special compartments (one square metre each, with a hole 5x5 cm for breathing), consisted of confining four prisoners, who were forced by the lack of space to remain standing all night for up to twenty nights, while still being forced to work during the day.

It was at Block 11 that the first attempts to kill people with Zyklon B were implemented in September 1941.

Interrogations
Prisoner interrogations involving extreme torture were also conducted within Block 11, often with use of the "Boger Swing" device, (Boger-Schaukel) invented by Wilhelm Boger, an SS officer who served within Auschwitz's Political Department.

See also
Auschwitz concentration camp

References

External links

Auschwitz concentration camp